Yohan Carlos Goutt Gonçalves (born 20 December 1994 in Suresnes, France) is a French-East Timorese alpine skier who has competed since 2013. Goutt Gonçalves has also qualified to compete for East Timor at the 2014 Winter Olympics in Sochi, Russia. By doing so, he became the first athlete ever to qualify from the country at the Winter Olympics. He also competed for East Timor at the 2018 Winter Olympics in PyeongChang.

Goutt Gonçalves is the son of a French father, and his mother is from East Timor, allowing him to compete for the latter country. His father's mother was Estonian Eva Goutt (maiden name Liiv), who is related to Estonian poet Juhan Liiv.

On 29 December 2013, in a race in Serbia, Goutt Gonçalves managed to lower his point total to below 140 and officially qualify for the 2014 Winter Olympics.

Goutt Gonçalves decided against participating at the  2017 FIS Alpine World Ski Championships to participate at the 2017 Asian Winter Games, becoming the first athlete to represent East Timor in the continental competition.

See also
 Timor-Leste at the 2014 Winter Olympics
 Timor-Leste at the 2017 Asian Winter Games
 Timor-Leste at the 2018 Winter Olympics

References

External links
 

1994 births
Living people
East Timorese people of Estonian descent
East Timorese people of French descent
East Timorese male alpine skiers
Olympic alpine skiers of East Timor
Alpine skiers at the 2014 Winter Olympics
Alpine skiers at the 2018 Winter Olympics
Alpine skiers at the 2022 Winter Olympics
French people of East Timorese descent
French people of Estonian descent
People from Suresnes
Alpine skiers at the 2017 Asian Winter Games